Sir Derek Henry Andrews, KCB, CBE (17 February 1933 – 13 March 2016) was an English civil servant. Educated at the London School of Economics, he joined the Ministry of Agriculture, Fisheries and Food in 1957 after completing National Service, and spent much of his career working on the Common Agricultural Policy. He was the ministry's Permanent Secretary from 1987 to 1993, leading it during the BSE and Salmonelli crises of the late 1980s. He was chairman of the Residuary Milk Marketing Board from 1994 to 2002.

References 

1933 births
2016 deaths
English civil servants
Alumni of the London School of Economics
Knights Companion of the Order of the Bath
Commanders of the Order of the British Empire